Bjørg Skjælaaen (6 September 1933 – 11 January 2019) was a Norwegian pair skater. She competed at the 1952 Winter Olympics in Oslo, where she placed 13th with partner Reidar Børjeson. She was Norwegian pairs champion in 1951 and 1952, with partner Børjeson, and in 1953, 1954 and 1955 together with partner Johannes Thorsen.

Results
(with Reidar Børjeson)

(with Johannes Thorsen)

References

External links

1933 births
2019 deaths
Norwegian female pair skaters
Olympic figure skaters of Norway
Figure skaters at the 1952 Winter Olympics
20th-century Norwegian women